The AlphaTauri AT01 is a Formula One car designed and constructed by Scuderia AlphaTauri to compete in the 2020 Formula 1 World Championship. The car was driven by Daniil Kvyat and Pierre Gasly. The AT01 was the first car to be built and run under the AlphaTauri name; the team, previously known as Scuderia Toro Rosso, was renamed ahead of the 2020 championship. 

The car was planned to make its competitive debut at the 2020 Australian Grand Prix, but this was delayed when the race was cancelled and the next nine events in the championship were postponed or cancelled in response to the COVID-19 pandemic.

Initial design and testing 
As AlphaTauri is the sister team of Red Bull Racing, the AT01 shares several components—including the suspension, gearbox and hydraulics—with the Red Bull Racing RB16. The car had its first shakedown at the Misano World Circuit Marco Simoncelli. The nose of the AT01 has evolved slightly from the nose of its predecessor, the STR14 with several minor changes relating to air inlets and the bodywork along the side of the front nose.

Competition history 
At the season opener at the 2020 Austrian Grand Prix, Gasly finished 7th with his teammate, Kvyat, finishing 12th. The rest of the season, Gasly outperformed his teammate and went on to win his first Grand Prix at the 2020 Italian Grand Prix. Over the season's 17 races, the car was able to achieve 1 win and 1 podium and finished 7th in the constructors' championship.

Later use 
A modified AT01 was used during testing of the 2022 tyre compounds after the 2021 Abu Dhabi Grand Prix.

Complete Formula One results 
(key)

Notes

  Driver failed to finish the race, but was classified as they had completed over 90% of the winner's race distance.

References 

2020 Formula One season cars
AlphaTauri Formula One cars